The Jean Rougeau Trophy is awarded annually to the Quebec Major Junior Hockey League team that records the most points in the regular season. The trophy was named for former league president Jean Rougeau.

Winners

See also
Hamilton Spectator Trophy - OHL
Scotty Munro Memorial Trophy - WHL

External links
 QMJHL official site List of trophy winners.

Quebec Major Junior Hockey League trophies and awards